Colin Bryce (born 4 August 1974, in Newcastle upon Tyne) is a former Great Britain Olympic bobsledder, Strongman, now working as a television presenter and producer. He currently works as a sports commentator for the BBC, ESPN, Fox Sports, Eurosport, Channel Five, Channel 4 and CBBC.

Early life and education 
Although born in Newcastle, Bryce grew up in Craigie, Perthshire, as well as spending six years living in the US where he made the Pennsylvania state finals as wrestler.

He is a graduate of the University of Glasgow in Physiology and Sport Science.

Brian Shaw revealed that Colin had been in a music video "Space Cowboy" when he was younger and often references it in his videos when around Colin.

Career 

Colin competed in World's Strongest Man in 1997 and 1999 (reaching the Finals in the latter).

At the 2002 Winter Olympics in Salt Lake City, he participated in the two-man bobsleigh event only two years after taking up the sport competitively. He was the brakeman for the British team despite recovering from a broken leg only five months before.

In 2004, he came out of the commentary booth and retirement to help an injury-ridden British team at the World Championships in Schoenau am Koenigsee, Germany, where he placed in the top 20 with driver Lee Johnston. Also in 2004, he was the International host for the IFF Miss Fitness World Championships in Warsaw, Poland.

He has also done some high-profile refereeing work on TV shows including ITV's Ant and Dec's Saturday Night Takeaway, BBC's Superstars, ESPN's World's Strongest Man coverage and CBBC's Airmageddon.

Some of his Eurosport work includes commentaries on the World Bobsleigh, Skeleton and Luge tour, the Sydney Olympics, Japanese game show Viking: The Ultimate Obstacle Course, the Nathan's Hot Dog Eating Contest, the Stihl Lumberjack World Championships, K-1 Total Knock Out and the BDO World Darts Championship.

Bryce was a BBC commentator at the Winter Olympics in Turin 2006 and Vancouver 2010, working alongside Paul Dickenson. They commentated on the only British medal when Amy Williams took Gold in the Skeleton event.

Since 2009 Bryce has been involved in the televised coverage of the World's Strongest Man contest initially on Bravo and subsequently on Channel 5 in the UK. Since 2003, he has presented the World Strongest Man Qualifying Tours, Giants Live and the Strongman Super Series, often with former England rugby player Martin Bayfield.

Bryce commentated the Highlander Challenge 2009 series which took place at Scone Palace and aired on Channel 4. Recently, he presented coverage of the Abu Dhabi Adventure Challenge in 2009 and 2010 on Eurosport. The event is an extreme 5-day adventure race all around the emirates.

References

External links
colinbryce.com, official website
2002 bobsleigh two-man results
British Olympic Association profile

1974 births
Bobsledders at the 2002 Winter Olympics
British male bobsledders
Scottish television presenters
Scottish television producers
Sportspeople from Newcastle upon Tyne
Scottish strength athletes
Living people
Olympic bobsledders of Great Britain